Antiplanes voyi is an extinct species of sea snail, a marine gastropod mollusc in the family Pseudomelatomidae.

Distribution
This extinct marine species was found off California, USA

References

 Gabb, W. M. "Paleontology of California, vol. 2." Cretaceous and Tertiary fossils. Sect 1.1 (1866): 1-38.
 McLean J.H. (1996). The Prosobranchia. In: Taxonomic Atlas of the Benthic Fauna of the Santa Maria Basin and Western Santa Barbara Channel. The Mollusca Part 2 – The Gastropoda. Santa Barbara Museum of Natural History. volume 9: 1-160

voyi
Gastropods described in 1866